Albert Khoshaba (born 1 July 1944) is a former Iraqi football forward who played for Iraq between 1967 and 1968. He played two matches and scored one goal.

Career statistics

International goals
Scores and results list Iraq's goal tally first.

References

Iraqi footballers
Iraq international footballers
Al-Shorta SC players
Association football forwards
Living people
1944 births